The Glazer Children's Museum is a non-profit children's museum located in downtown Tampa, Florida, next to the Tampa Museum of Art and Curtis Hixon Park, alongside the Tampa Riverwalk. It is part of the Waterfront Arts District.

Housed in a 53,000-square-foot facility in downtown Tampa, the museum features interactive exhibits in multiple themed areas. Traveling exhibits occasionally supplement the museum's permanent collection as well.

History

The history of Glazer Children's Museum dates back to the 1965 opening of Safety Village in Lowry Park. 

The Children's Museum of Tampa, Inc. was founded in 1986 by community volunteers and with support of many private and public partners. The Children's Museum of Tampa served children and families in the Tampa Bay Area for over two decades. From humble beginnings in a small storefront location, the museum provided exhibits that gave children a safe place to learn and play.

In 1989, with support from the City of Tampa, the museum relocated next to the city zoo. This site operated under the name Kid City and consisted of a series of outdoor miniature buildings simulating a small town. From 1989 to 2003, Kid City was an ideal space for the museum to provide curriculum centered on the value of community. Kid City served over 750,000 visitors from the Tampa Bay Area and became an important part of the cultural and educational fabric of the community.

In 2003, museum volunteers and staff began looking at the next step of expansion to meet the needs of its community. After conducting a feasibility study and gathering input from more than 400 people, plans were drawn for a new 53,000-square-foot state-of-the-art children's museum in downtown Tampa's new Curtis Hixon Waterfront Park. After a $22 million capital campaign to build the new building, construction began in March 2009 and was completed in April 2010, the museum  was then opened on September 25, 2010. In honor of the Glazer Family Foundation, who had donated $5 million, the Museum was named as Glazer Children's Museum. In its first year of operation, the museum served 250,000 guests, donated more than 25,000 admission tickets to underserved youth populations, and saw approximately 26,000 children during school field trips and educational programs.

Since its opening in 2010, Glazer Children's Museum has hosted over 2 million guests and is an integral part of the cultural corridor of museums, libraries, theaters, and performing arts centers in Tampa Bay.

Awards and Accolades 

 2012 - Recipient of Educational Outreach Award from WEDU Be More Awards
 2015 - Recipient of Educational Outreach Award from WEDU Be More Awards
 2016 - Recipient of Diversity and Inclusion Award from FL Division of Cultural Affairs
 2017 - Non-Profit of the Year: Arts, Culture and Humanities from Tampa Bay Business Journal
 2017 - Finalist in the WEDU Be More Awards
 2019 - Finalist in the Tampa Downtown Partnership Urban Excellence Awards
 2019 - Finalist in the WEDU Be More Awards
 2019 - Best Place to Have a Birthday Party from Tampa Bay Times Best of the Best Awards
 2019 - Employer of the Year from Mayor's Alliance for Persons with Disabilities
 2019 - Marketer of the Year from AMA Tampa Bay
 2019 - Non-Profit of the Year Honoree from TBBJ ONE Tampa Bay
 2020 - Finalist: Best International Digital Activity from Kids in Museums]

References

Museums in Tampa, Florida
Children's museums in Florida
1987 establishments in Florida